Pirjed (also Romanized as Pīrjed and Pīr Jad; also known as Pīrjerd and Pīrjad-e Pā’īn) is a village in Kakasharaf Rural District, in the Central District of Khorramabad County, Lorestan Province, Iran. At the 2006 census, its population was 691, in 131 families.

References 

Towns and villages in Khorramabad County